The Granada City Orchestra  (in Spanish:  Orquesta Ciudad de Granada, OCG) is a Spanish orchestra based in Granada, Spain.  Its primary concert venue is the Auditorio Manuel de Falla.  

The City of Granada and the provincial council of Andalusia founded the OCG in 1988 at the initiative of Patrick Meadows and Antonio Navarro, the Director of the Auditorio Manuel de Falla. Misha Rachlevsky was the founding director and artistic director. Juan de Udeata was the orchestra's principal conductor from 1990 to 1994.  Subsequent principal conductors have been Josep Pons (1994–2004) and Jean-Jacques Kantorow (2004–2008).  The current principal conductor is Andrea Marcon, since the 2012–2013 season.

The OCG has recorded commercially for such labels as harmonia mundi.

Principal conductors
 Misha Rachlevsky (1988–1990)
 Juan de Udaeta (1990–1994)
 Josep Pons (1994–2004)
 Jean-Jacques Kantorow (2004–2008)
 Salvador Mas Conde (2008–2012)
 Andrea Marcon (2012–present)

References

External links
 The orchestra's official website

Spanish orchestras
Musical groups established in 1990